Darren Westlake is a paralympic athlete from Great Britain competing mainly in category T12 1500 metre events.  Darren has twice competed in the 1500m at the Paralympic games first in 2000 where he won a silver medal and then in the 2004 Summer Paralympics where he did not win a medal.

He has a dog called Drako.

Athletics career 
He represented South Devon Athletic Club at a club level, as well as South West Road Runners.

In 2000, he was selected in the British team for the Paralympics, competing in the T12 1500 metres and winning a silver medal. He won the first heat, before finishing second behind the winner of the second heat in the final.

In 2001, he was selected for the International Blind Sports European Athletics Championships over the 1500 metres.

In 2003, he was selected for and competed in the International Blind Sports Association Games in Quebec, where he competed in the men's B2 1500 metres. He ran comfortably in the heats, qualifying for the final. In the final, he finished in third with 4:00.95 for bronze.

In 2004, he was selected again in the British team for the Paralympics, and competed in the T13 1500 metres. He came third in his heat, before finishing eleventh in the final.

References

External links
 

Paralympic athletes of Great Britain
Athletes (track and field) at the 2000 Summer Paralympics
Paralympic silver medalists for Great Britain
Living people
Medalists at the 2000 Summer Paralympics
Year of birth missing (living people)
Paralympic medalists in athletics (track and field)
British male middle-distance runners
Visually impaired middle-distance runners
Paralympic middle-distance runners